Stewart McLaurin is an author and non-profit executive who is now the president of the White House Historical Association.

Background
McLaurin is the son of Stewart Parnell McLaurin and Gwendolyn McLaurin (née Stafford). An Alabama native, McLaurin attended Shades Valley High School and the University of Alabama.

Active in philanthropic management, from 1989 to 2014, McLaurin has held senior positions with the Mount Vernon estate, the Ronald Reagan Presidential Foundation, the Motion Picture Association, Georgetown University, the American Village Citizenship Trust, and the American Red Cross.

After leaving the American Red Cross, McLaurin went to work for the 2000 presidential campaign of Elizabeth Dole. His relationship with Dole continues today as he sits on the board of the Elizabeth Dole Foundation.

Since 2014, McLaurin has served as the president of the White House Historical Association (WHHA). His work with the WHHA is focused on expanding the reach, educational programming , and impact of the organization.

Published works

Further reading

References

External links

Stewart McLaurin at the WHHA
Stewart McLaurin on C-SPAN
Stewart  McLaurin on twitter

1959 births
University of Alabama alumni
Living people